The Blue Diamond Stakes is a Melbourne Racing Club Group 1 Thoroughbred horse race for two-year-olds, at set weights, run over 1200 metres at Caulfield Racecourse in Melbourne, Victoria, Australia. The event is Victoria's richest two-year-old race with total prize money of A$2,000,000.

History
Prizemoney was increased from $1 million to $1.5 million in 2016 and to $2 million in 2023.

Distance
 1971–1972 - 6 furlongs (~1200 metres)
 1973 onwards - 1200 metres

Venue
In 1996 the event was held at Flemington Racecourse due to reconstruction of Caulfield Racecourse.  In 2023 the race was run at Sandown Racecourse.

Records
Trainer: David Hayes - 5 wins
Jockey: Dwayne Dunn - 4 wins
Time: Hurricane Sky (1994): 1:08.1

Winners

 2023 - Little Brose
 2022 - Daumier 
 2021 - Artorius 
2020 - Tagaloa 
2019 - Lyre 
2018 - Written By 
2017 - Catchy 
2016 - Extreme Choice 
2015 - Pride Of Dubai 
2014 - Earthquake
2013 - Miracles Of Life 
2012 - Samaready
2011 - Sepoy
2010 - Star Witness
2009 - Reward For Effort
2008 - Reaan
2007 - Sleek Chassis
2006 - Nadeem
2005 - Undoubtedly
2004 - Alinghi
2003 - †Kusi
2002 - Bel Esprit
2001 - True Jewels
2000 - Road To Success
1999 - Redoute's Choice
1998 - Danelagh
1997 - Knowledge
1996 - Paint
1995 - Principality
1994 - Hurricane Sky
1993 - Lady Jakeo
1992 - Riva Diva
1991 - Canonise
1990 - Mahaasin
1989 - Courtza
1988 - Zeditave
1987 - Midnight Fever
1986 - Bounding Away
1985 - Let's Get Physical
1984 - Street Cafe
1983 - Love A Show
1982 - Rancher
1981 - Black Shoes
1980 - Aare
1979 - Star Shower
1978 - Manikato
1977 - Blazing Saddles
1976 - Out Of Danger
1975 - Lord Dudley
1974 - Forina
1973 - New Gleam
1972 - John's Hope
1971 - Tolerance

† Roedean finished first but was later disqualified for returning a positive swab

References

Flat horse races for two-year-olds
Group 1 stakes races in Australia
Caulfield Racecourse